Iloca is a small coastal town in Chile, located in the commune of Licantén, Curicó Province, Maule Region. It is located 120 kilometers west of Curicó.

According to the 2002 census, it has a population of 345 inhabitants, although it increases considerably during the summer season.

This settlement was one of the most damaged by the 2010 Chile earthquake, and mostly after its tsunami that hit the Chilean coast hours later. Approximately a 70% of the Iloca's constructions were destroyed by the cataclysm.

The closest main town is Constitución, Chile

Toponymy 

"Iloca" comes from Mapudungun ilokan, that means in Spanish carnear (to kill an animal and to extract its meat).

See also
Duao

References 

Beaches of Chile
Populated places in Curicó Province
Coasts of Maule Region